David Cecil is a British theatre producer. He was arrested in Uganda over a play which references homosexuality on 17 September 2012.

Arrest
Cecil produced The River and the Mountain, written by Beau Hopkins, a British writer in Kampala and directed by Angela Emurwon. The cast was all-Ugandan. The dramatic comedy was programmed at the National Theatre at the Uganda National Cultural Centre but had to relocate after the Ugandan Media Council on 16 August 2012 provisorily banned a performance in public.

The Ugandan minister of ethics said the play “justified the promotion of homosexuality in Uganda," and added, "We will put pressure on anyone who says this abomination is acceptable.” Cecil was placed in a prison near Kampala on 15 and 16 September. A Ugandan court released him on bail on 17 September after charging him in connection with the staging of the play, charges which carried up to a potential two-year jail sentence.

A petition calling for the charges against Cecil to be dropped, organised by Index on Censorship and David Lan, was signed by more than 2500 people, including Mike Leigh, Stephen Fry, Sandi Toksvig and Simon Callow.

In January 2013, a magistrate dismissed all charges against Cecil. In February 2013, Cecil was again detained by the police as a person described by the Ministry of Ethics as undesirable. He was then deported back to the United Kingdom. The deportation was done very quickly and there was concern that proper legal procedure was not in place before the deportation. Chris Ward, a spokesman for the British High Commission in Uganda, said there was "concern that [Cecil] was deported without a chance to challenge the deportation". He added that British officials would be "looking at ways in which we can discuss due process with the Ugandan authorities".

See also
Uganda Anti-Homosexuality Bill
Politics of Uganda
Law enforcement in Uganda
Human rights in Uganda

References

Prisoners and detainees of Uganda
British theatre managers and producers
Living people
British expatriates in Uganda
British LGBT writers
British people imprisoned abroad
Year of birth missing (living people)
21st-century LGBT people